Judith of Habsburg (13 March 1271 – 21 May 1297) was queen of Bohemia and Poland from 1285 until her death as the wife of the Přemyslid king Wenceslaus II.

Early life 
Judith was the youngest daughter of King Rudolf I of Germany and Gertrude of Hohenberg. She was born in the Swabian town of Rheinfelden, where her father still resided as a count before he was elected king of Germany in 1273. When she was five, she became the object of her father's political plans: on 21 October 1276 King Rudolf accepted the homage of his bitter rival King Ottokar II of Bohemia in the Austrian capital Vienna, and to seal the peace, both decided that Judith should marry Ottokar's son Wenceslaus. The agreement, however, did not last and the conflict erupted again, ending with King Ottokar's final defeat and death in the 1278 Battle on the Marchfeld.

After King Ottokar's death, the Brandenburg margrave Otto V had guardianship over minor King Wenceslaus II, acting as Bohemian regent. After conflicts arose with Ottokar's widow Kunigunda of Halych, Margrave Otto temporarily held Wenceslaus as a prisoner at Bezděz Castle and in the Ascanian fortress of Spandau in Brandenburg. He did not return to Prague until 1283.
As part of a reconciliation process, the formal engagement between Judith and Wenceslaus was renewed in 1279 at Jihlava; nevertheless, the bridal couple did not meet until in January 1285 a wedding ceremony was held by the Přemyslid and Habsburg dynasties in the City of Cheb (Eger). The bride was given a dowry stretching "from the Duchy of Austria, Moravian border to the border of Danube". The ceremony in Cheb was followed by a "festive" wedding night, but soon after, King Rudolf took Judith back to Germany, since she was still of a young age. Moreover, the remarriage of Wenceslaus' mother Kunigunda to the Bohemian noble Zavis of Falkenstein appeared unacceptable to the king.

Queenship 
Though Kunigunda died later in that year and Wenceslaus II had sworn an oath of fealty to Rudolf in order to receive his Bohemian heritage, his coronation as king of Bohemia had to be postponed as Judith was not present. In Summer 1287, she did eventually leave her family in Germany and came to the Prague court to be with her husband. One year later, Wenceslaus took over the political power. Like King Rudolf, Judith hated Wenceslaus' stepfather Zavis of Falkenstein, who had acted as regent with Kunigunda. Judith urged Wenceslaus to bring Zavis to trial and he was eventually arrested and executed at Hluboká Castle in 1290.

Upon her father's death in 1291, Judith further tried to reconcile her husband with her brother Albert, who struggled for the German throne with Count Adolf of Nassau.

Judith and Wenceslaus were finally crowned on 2 June 1297. Judith was not in good health at the time, having just given birth to her tenth child, which was stillborn. She died a few weeks after the coronation in Prague, at age twenty-six. She had been pregnant during much of her twelve years of marriage, giving birth almost once per year.

According to the family chronicles, Judith was described as beautiful, noble and virtuous. She supported her husband's claim on the Kingdom of Poland, where he ruled over the Seniorate Province at Kraków since 1291 and was able to succeed King Przemysł II in 1296.

Issue 

Wenceslaus II and Judith had ten children:
 Přemysl Otakar (6 May 1288 – 19 November 1288).
 Wenceslaus III (6 October 1289 – 4 August 1306); King of Bohemia, King of Hungary and King of Poland.
 Agnes (6 October 1289 – after 1292 before 1306), twin of Wenceslaus III, betrothed to Rupert of Nassau, son of King Adolf of Germany, but died young.
 Anna (10 October 1290 – 3 September 1313), married in 1306 to Duke Henry of Carinthia.
 Elizabeth (20 January 1292 – 28 September 1330), married in 1310 to John I of Bohemia.
 Judith (3 March 1293 – 3 August 1294).
 John (26 February 1294 – 1 March 1295).
 John (21 February 1295 – 6 December 1296).
 Margareta (21 February 1296 – 8 April 1322), married to Bolesław III the Generous, Duke of Wrocław.
 Judith (born and died 21 May 1297).
Of the ten children only four lived to adulthood.

Family legacy 
Wenceslaus III and then Anna and Elisabeth succeeded their father as rulers of Bohemia. Elisabeth was the mother of Charles IV, Holy Roman Emperor, his son was Sigismund, Holy Roman Emperor.

Judith is also an ancestor of Anne of Denmark, who married James I of England. Among Anne's children were Charles I of England and Elizabeth of Bohemia; Elizabeth is one of Judith's successors as Queen of Bohemia.

References

External links 

1271 births
1297 deaths
13th-century House of Habsburg
Bohemian queens consort
Deaths in childbirth
Polish queens consort
13th-century Polish nobility
13th-century Polish women
13th-century German nobility
13th-century German women
Burials at St. Vitus Cathedral
Daughters of kings